The Bavarian CL Bay 06b was a short open coach for branch line services with the Royal Bavarian State Railways (k.Bay.Sts.B.). It was listed in their 1913 fleet register under Design Sheet No. 570.

Development 
With the growth of the branch line network in the Kingdom of Bavaria, there was a need for suitable coaches on the so-called Lokalbahnen or local railway lines. Since the only available locomotives were tank engines with low tractive power, such as the Class PtL 2/2, passenger coaches of a particularly light design were required. These coaches were not suitable for military transport.

Procurement 
Between 1905 and 1911 a total of 281 wagons of classes BL, BCL, CL and PPostL were procured, all of which - except for the wagons of Class PPostL - had a uniform floor plan, open platforms at each end with Dixi gates on the steps and gangways only protected by a single iron railing. Large window panes were fitted instead of the composite windows that had been usual up to that point. They are sometimes referred to as 'the shorts' or 'the short ones' (Die Kurze).

Between 1906 and 1909, 74 of these wagons, built to the specifications of Design Sheet 570, were procured in a total of five batches from the company of Waggonfabrik Josef Rathgeber in Munich. In contrast to the CL based on Sheet 569, these had a service compartment for the guard.

Career 
Four coaches were retired by 1939. After the end of the Second World War in 1945, the location of other new coaches could no longer be ascertained. Of the vehicles delivered, 51 entered DB service, where they were decommissioned by 1960.

Design features

Underframe 
The underframe of the coach was made entirely of rivetted structural steel. The outer longitudinal beams were U-shaped with outward facing flanges. The crossbeams were also made of U-profiles and not cranked. The wagons had screw couplings of VDEV design. The drawbar ran the length of the vehicle and was spring-loaded in the middle. As buffing equipment, the wagons had slotted cylindrical buffers with an installation length of 612 millimetres, the buffer plates had a diameter of 370 millimetres.

Running gear 
The coaches had riveted half-timbered axle boxes of the short type, made of sheet steel. The axles were housed in sliding axle bearings. The wheels were spoked. Due to the long wheelbase of 5,000 millimetres, standard VDEV radial axles were used.
In addition to a screw brake, which was located on one of the platforms at the end of the coach, the coaches also had air brakes of the Westinghouse system.

Body 
The frame of the coach body consisted of wooden posts. This was covered with sheet metal on the outside and wood on the inside. The joints of the sheets were covered by cover strips. The roof was gently rounded and extended beyond the open end-platforms. The coaches had folding branch line steps, which were later replaced by normal ones.

Facilities 
The coach was 3rd class only and had a total of 31 seats and a toilet. A total of 20 standing places were designated for the two end-platforms.
The coaches were lit by paraffin lamps and had steam heating. They were ventilated by static ceiling ventilators.

Coach numbering

See also 
The following coaches were also built for the Lokalbahn branch line network:
 BCL Bay 09, long passenger coach
 CL Bay 11a, long passenger coach
 GwL, branch line goods van
 PwPost Bay 06, mail/luggage van

References

Literature 
 
 
 

Railway coaches of the Royal Bavarian State Railways